Olga Viktorovna Kaliturina (born 9 March 1976, Ryazan) is a Russian high jumper.

Her personal best jump is 1.98 metres, achieved in August 2004 in Moscow.

Achievements

See also
List of World Athletics Championships medalists (women)
List of high jump national champions (women)
List of European Athletics Championships medalists (women)
List of European Athletics Indoor Championships medalists (women)
High jump at the World Championships in Athletics

References

1976 births
Living people
Sportspeople from Ryazan
Russian female high jumpers
World Athletics Championships medalists
World Athletics U20 Championships winners
European Athletics Championships medalists
Russian Athletics Championships winners